This is a list of members of the Australian Senate from 1953 to 1956. Half of its members were elected at the 28 April 1951 election and had terms deemed to start on 1 July 1950 and finishing on 30 June 1956; the other half were elected at the 9 May 1953 election and had terms starting on 1 July 1953 and finishing on 30 June 1959.

Notes

References

Members of Australian parliaments by term
20th-century Australian politicians
Australian Senate lists